Yuber Asprilla born in Quibdó, Chocó, Colombia on 12 November 1992 is a football player, who plays as a forward for Atlético Huila.

Asprilla is a product of the Millonarios youth system and played with the Millonarios first team between February 2010 and 2014.

Statistics (Official games/Colombian Ligue and Colombian Cup)
(As of November 14, 2010)

References

External links
BDFA profile

1992 births
Living people
People from Quibdó
Colombian footballers
Colombian expatriate footballers
Millonarios F.C. players
Once Caldas footballers
Deportivo Pasto footballers
La Equidad footballers
Envigado F.C. players
Alianza Petrolera players
Club Universidad Nacional footballers
Atlético Bucaramanga footballers
Atlético Huila footballers
Categoría Primera A players
Categoría Primera B players
Liga MX players
Association football forwards
Colombian expatriate sportspeople in Mexico
Expatriate footballers in Mexico
Sportspeople from Chocó Department